Xestonotus lugubris is a species of beetle in the family Carabidae, the only species in the genus Xestonotus.

References

Harpalinae